Shafik Assad (10 April 1937 – 6 June 2004) was an Israeli-Druze politician who served as a member of the Knesset for the Democratic Movement for Change, the Democratic Movement, Ahva and Telem between 1977 and 1981.

Biography
Born in Beit Jann during the Mandate era, Assad attended high school in Rameh. He served as secretary of the Histadrut trade union in his hometown between 1961 and 1967, and headed the town's local council from 1969 until 1976.

He joined the new Democratic Movement for Change (Dash) party in the mid-1970s, and was elected to the Knesset on its list in 1977. On 14 September 1978 Assad was one of seven MKs to form the Democratic Movement after Dash split up. On 8 July 1980 he and Shlomo Eliyahu left the Democratic Movement to establish the Ahva faction. On 15 June 1981 he moved parties again, this time joining Telem, but lost his seat in the 30 June 1981 elections.

He died in 2004 at the age of 67.

References

External links
 

1937 births
2004 deaths
Ahva (political party) politicians
Arab people in Mandatory Palestine
Democratic Movement (Israel) politicians
Democratic Movement for Change politicians
Druze members of the Knesset
Israeli Druze
Israeli trade unionists
Mayors of local councils in Israel
Members of the 9th Knesset (1977–1981)
People from Beit Jann
Road incident deaths in Israel